The 1968–69 Iowa Hawkeyes men's basketball team represented the University of Iowa in intercollegiate basketball during the 1968–69 season. The team was led by Ralph Miller and played their home games at the Iowa Field House. The Hawkeyes finished the season 12–12 overall with a Big Ten conference record of 5–9.

Roster

Schedule/results

|-
!colspan=8| Regular Season

Rankings

References

Iowa Hawkeyes men's basketball seasons
Iowa
Hawkeyes
Hawkeyes